The First Legislative Council of Hong Kong was the first meeting of the legislative branch of the HKSAR government after the handover of Hong Kong, replacing the Provisional Legislative Council existing between 1997 and 1998. The membership of the LegCo is based on the 1998 election. It had the shortest term of the session was from 1 July 1998 to 30 June 2000, only two years unlike the latter legislative session of four years. The legislature was held during the first term of the Tung Chee-hwa's administration. The pro-democracy camp who did not participate in the Provisional Legislative Council held 20 seats with Democratic Party being the largest party. Notable newcomers to the Legislative Council included Cyd Ho, Bernard Chan, Lui Ming-wah, and Wong Yung-kan.

Major events
 12 December 1999: The Legislative Council passed the controversial Provision of Municipal Services (Reorganization) Bill to repeal the two provisional municipal councils, the Urban Council and Regional Council.

Major legislation

Enacted
 12 December 1999: Provision of Municipal Services (Reorganization) Bill

Composition

Graphical representation of the Legislative Council

Leadership

List of members
The following table is a list of LegCo members elected on 24 May 1998 in the order of precedence.

Members who did not serve throughout the term are italicised. New members elected since the general election are noted at the bottom of the page.

Key to changes since legislative election:
a = change in party allegiance
b = by-election
c = other change

By-elections
 29 October 1998, a by-election was held for Regional Council constituency after some votes were found problematic. Tang Siu-tong won again in the by-election.
 5 November 1998, Fung Chi-kin replaced Chim Pui-chung in the Financial Services by-election after Chim was found conspiring to forge documents in 1998, whereupon he was impeached and disqualified as a legislator by Legco.

Other changes

1999
 Ma Fung-kwok and Ng Ching-fai (Election Committee) co-founded the New Century Forum on 23 June 1999.

2000
 Ambrose Cheung (Urban Council) representing the Provisional Urban Council resigned from the Legislative Council as protest to the government's decision on abolishing the two municipal councils, Urban Council and Regional Council with effect from 1 January 2000.
 Lau Chin-shek (Kowloon West) was expelled from the Democratic Party in May 2000 because of having dual membership of both Democratic Party and The Frontier.

Committees

See also
 1998 Hong Kong legislative election

References

Terms of the Legislative Council of Hong Kong
1998 in Hong Kong
1999 in Hong Kong
2000 in Hong Kong
1998 establishments in Hong Kong
2000s disestablishments in Hong Kong